Sofar Sounds (acronym; Songs from a Room), is a music events startup company, responsible for various small performances, hosted in over 400 cities. They are headquartered at the Roundhouse, London, UK - founded in 2009. 


History
The company started in London, March 2009, by; Rafe Offer, Rocky Start, and Dave Alexander. By inviting eight friends to Alexander's North-London flat, to watch them perform in his own living-room. Their second ever show (first ticketed event) in London, fortunately consisting of a much higher, paid attendance. The successful continuation of such shows, allowed the company to expand to locations such as; Paris, New York City, and others - arriving in Los Angeles, early 2011. 

Jim Lucchese became the CEO of Sofar Sounds in, February 2019.

In May 2019, the company raised $25M from Battery Ventures and Union Square Ventures, in addition to $6M, raised from Octopus Ventures and Virgin Group. The money being obtained for two main focuses; to create artist-focused services & to support the communities the company had created around the world.

As of November 2019, the company hosted over 22,000 performances.

In 2019, Sofar Sounds announced the creation of Sofar Crew, hired as part-time employees to work alongside Sofar Ambassadors.

The company was investigated in 2019, by the New York Department of Labor for their use of unpaid labor, eventually reaching a settlement. The settlement being; the discontinuation of using/relying on volunteer-workers within their business model.

In August 2019, Sofar Sounds relocated their headquarters to Roundhouse, a creative-hub that also includes the Bucks Music Group.

In March 2020, Sofar suspended all shows as a result of the international coronavirus pandemic. The company is supposedly compensating all artists for cancelled performances, working to reschedule them, and creating a Global Artist Fund, with a goal of $250k for live-music relief. At the end of March 2020, the company launched a daily live-stream to help support independent artists during the said crisis. Allowing those participating to either donate to artists directly, or to the Global Artist Fund.

Events
Typically, three artists perform at each Sofar gig with no opener and no headliner, an approach that offers an equal opportunity for all of the artists. Performers apply to be considered via a form on the website and can be musicians of any genre. As of February 2020, there is an Artist Dashboard where artists can request to play shows in specific cities and on specific dates or within a range of dates.

The guest list is selected with an email ballot; the line-up for a concert is not disclosed until the event starts; the location is announced 24 hours before the show. Events are normally BYOB and the audience agrees to three basic principles: coming on time, staying until the end and listening quietly without phones or other distractions. This ensures that the focus is kept on the artists and the atmosphere respectful.

Artists are often filmed, with the edited video uploaded to the Sofar Sounds YouTube channel and shared on the website.

Operating model
There are two types of Sofar cities: full-time cities and ambassador locations. The majority of Sofar cities are run by ambassadors who put on one or two shows a month.

Sofar currently operates independently in approximately 444 cities worldwide. 90% of these are free shows where they have a pass-the-hat process for collecting money which pays the artists and covers expenses. In the other 10% of those cities, they sell online tickets. As of February 2020, there are three payment levels in the ticketed Sofar cities and artists are paid based on ticket sales. The current profit split in the average major city where Sofar has shows is 63% to 37% in favor of the artists.

, undiscounted tickets are $10–$30 per person in the US, £10-18 in the UK, €13 in Madrid, and $12–18 (CAD) in Vancouver and Toronto.

Notable partnerships and performers 

In June 2015, Sofar Sounds partnered with Uber to host a series of secret gigs in London.

In July 2016, it was announced that Virgin Group's Sir Richard Branson would invest in Sofar Sounds.

In March 2017, a partnership was announced with Airbnb for their new Music Experiences format, which enables Airbnb customers in San Francisco to reserve seats at a Sofar event via the Trips platform.

UK and Irish acts who have performed at Sofar shows include James Bay, Hozier, Emeli Sandé, Will Young, Tom Odell, Shura, Benjamin Clementine, actor Robert Pattinson, Wolf Alice, Bastille, and Lianne La Havas. Both Bastille and Lianne La Havas performed at special events in London that Sofar put on in collaboration with the charity War Child. Bastille also took part in a special live-streamed Sofar Sounds #Voting show that was held in London in June 2016 to encourage people to vote in the EU referendum. Other London performers include Lucy Rose, The Staves and Kae Tempest. In 2013, they had a surprise last minute performance from the Twilight star Robert Pattinson.

Some US performers who have appeared in Sofar concerts include Giselle Bellas, Leon Bridges, Fantastic Negrito, Saba, X Ambassadors, Tank and the Bangas, Yeasayer, and Yeah Yeah Yeahs front woman Karen O, while acts such as Núria Graham and Ali Somay have played Sofar Barcelona and Sofar Istanbul, respectively.

The local Sofar Sounds branch in Los Angeles also teamed up with the charity Movember for a Giving Tuesday event, while the New York City branch previously organized a gig in aid of Planned Parenthood.

On 20 June 2017, (World Refugee Day) Sofar Sounds announced a global event series called 'Give a Home', in partnership with Amnesty International. 'Give a Home' took place on 20 September 2017 with thousands of performances in over 300 cities and 60 countries, in aid of the millions of refugees who were forced to flee their homes. Confirmed artists included Ed Sheeran, Moby, Gregory Porter, Daughter, Jesse & Joy, Hot Chip, Ludovico Einaudi, The National, Mashrou' Leila, and more.

At the 2017 Grammy awards, many of the nominees had previously played Sofar locations including Leon Bridges, Fantastic Negrito and Saba.

References

External links 

 

British social networking websites
Sharing economy
Social planning websites
Companies based in the London Borough of Tower Hamlets
British companies established in 2011
Event management companies of the United Kingdom
Entertainment companies established in 2011
Recurring events established in 2009